RBA are initials that may refer to:

People
 Rod Brind'Amour, Canadian professional ice hockey player and coach
 Roberto Bautista Agut, Spanish tennis player

Organizations
  Sale Airport in Rabat, Morocco, IATA code
 Reserve Bank of Australia
 Ritchie Bros. Auctioneers, Canada, stock exchange symbol
 Royal Bhutan Army
 Royal Brunei Airlines. ICAO code
 Royal Society of British Artists

Math and science
 Relative byte address in an Entry Sequenced Data Set
 Runbook automation, in a computer system or network

Other
Ranger Body Armor, US Army ballistic vest
Regents Bachelor of Arts, a degree program offered by the University System of West Virginia
Role-based assessment, in psychology
Rudy Bruner Award for Urban Excellence, American award in architecture